Hydrelia lucata, the light carpet moth, is a moth in the family Geometridae. It is found in North America, including Maine, Maryland, Michigan, Minnesota, New Brunswick, New Hampshire, Ohio, Ontario, Pennsylvania, Quebec, Tennessee and 
Wisconsin.

References

Moths described in 1857
Asthenini
Moths of North America